Red Bull BC One is a rhythm game developed by Smack Down Productions and published by Playlogic Entertainment and Ignition Entertainment for Nintendo DS in 2008. The game is based on the Red Bull BC One breakdancing competition organized by the energy drink company Red Bull.

Reception

The game received "generally unfavorable reviews" according to the review aggregation website Metacritic.

References

External links
 

2008 video games
Advergames
Nintendo DS games
Nintendo DS-only games
Playlogic Entertainment games
Red Bull BC One
Rhythm games
Video games developed in France
Works based on advertisements
UTV Ignition Games games
Single-player video games